
Year 653 (DCLIII) was a common year starting on Tuesday (link will display the full calendar) of the Julian calendar. The denomination 653 for this year has been used since the early medieval period, when the Anno Domini calendar era became the prevalent method in Europe for naming years.

Events 
 By place 

 Byzantine Empire 
 Emperor Constans II voluntarily surrenders Armenia to the Arabs, following a truce with Muawiyah, governor of Syria. Muawiyah grants the Armenians virtual autonomy, and appoints the nakharar Theodor Rshtuni as ruler of Armenia.
 Muawiyah leads a raid against Rhodes, taking the scattered pieces of the Colossus of Rhodes (one of the Seven Wonders of the Ancient World) and shipping it back to Syria, where he destroys the bronze scrap to make coins.

 Europe 
 King Rodoald is murdered after a six-month reign, and is succeeded by Aripert I, who is elected as king of the Lombards. He spreads Catholicism over the Lombard realm and builds many new churches through the kingdom.
 Atto succeeds Theodelap as duke of Spoleto, in Central Italy (approximate date).

 Britain 
 King Penda of Mercia secures dominance over the area of Middle Anglia, where he establishes his son Peada as ruler. 
 Peada marries Alchflaed, daughter of King Oswiu of Bernicia, and is baptised at Ad Murum (in the region of Hadrian's Wall) by bishop Finan.
 King Œthelwald of Deira rejects Oswiu's overlordship, and turns to Penda instead. Penda mounts another attack against Bernicia (approximate date).
 Talorgan I, nephew of Oswiu, is crowned king of the Picts. He probably accepts Northumbrian overlordship and pays tribute.
 King Sigeberht I of Essex dies after a 36-year reign, and is succeeded by his relative Sigeberht II. 
 Sigeberht II is persuaded by Oswiu to adopt Christianity, as part of a mobilization against Penda.

 Asia 
 Emperor Kōtoku sends an embassy to the court of the Tang Dynasty in China. Japanese ambassadors, priests and students sail for the capital Chang'an, but some of the ships are lost en route.
 Prince Tenji of Japan changes his residence to Asuka (Nara Prefecture), with other imperial family members and ministers. Only Emperor Kōtoku stays in the Naniwa Palace (approximate date).

 By topic 

 Religion 
 June 17 – Pope Martin I is arrested in the Lateran in Rome, along with Maximus the Confessor, on the orders of Emperor Constans II, and taken to imprisonment in Constantinople.
 Northumbrian missionaries under St. Cedd are despatched to Essex, to found the monastery at Bradwell-on-Sea.
 The Temple of Sinheungsa in Gangwon Province (South Korea) is constructed by the Buddhist monk Jajang.

Births 
 Childeric II, king of the Franks (approximate date)
 Li Xian, prince of the Tang Dynasty (d. 684)

Deaths 
 March 6 – Li Ke, prince of the Tang Dynasty
 September 30 – Honorius, archbishop of Canterbury
 Abbas ibn Abd al-Muttalib, uncle of Muhammad (approximate date)
 Chen Shuozhen, Chinese rebel leader
 Chindasuinth, king of the Visigoths
 Marcán mac Tommáin, king of Uí Maine (Ireland)
 Plato, exarch of Ravenna
 Rodoald, king of the Lombards
 Romaric, Frankish nobleman
 Sigeberht I, king of Essex
 Talorc III, king of the Picts
 Theodelap, duke of Spoleto (approximate date)
 Zhang Xingcheng, chancellor of the Tang Dynasty (b. 587)

References

Sources